Úrvalsdeild Men's Playoffs MVP is an Icelandic basketball award which is awarded annually to the player judged most valuable to his team during the Úrvalsdeild playoffs.

Winners 
The following is a list of the recent Úrvalsdeild Men's Playoffs MVP's.

References

External links
Icelandic Basketball Federation Official Website 

European basketball awards
Úrvalsdeild karla (basketball)
Basketball most valuable player awards